Bid Barzeh-ye Sefidar (also Romanized as Bīd Barzeh-e Sefīdār; also known as Bīd Barzeh) is a village in Sepidar Rural District, in the Central District of Boyer-Ahmad County, Kohgiluyeh and Boyer-Ahmad Province, Iran. At the 2006 census, its population was 100, in 20 families.

References 

Populated places in Boyer-Ahmad County